Norwood is a town and census-designated place in Norfolk County, Massachusetts, United States. Norwood is part of the Greater Boston area. As of the 2020 census, the population was 31,611. The town was named after Norwood, England. Norwood is on the Neponset River, which runs all the way to Boston Harbor from Foxborough.

History

The Town of Norwood, officially formed in 1833, was until that time part of Dedham, known as the "mother of towns", as fourteen of the present communities of eastern Massachusetts lay within its original borders. Long used as a hunting ground by Native Americans, Norwood was first settled by Ezra Morse in 1678. He set up a sawmill in what is now South Norwood, the part of town to which the first concentration of families, almost all of whom were farmers, migrated over the next half-century.

During the American Revolution, there was a Minuteman company organized in the area. Its captain, Aaron Guild, on learning of the British marching on Lexington and Concord to seize the munitions stored there, rode to join the fight and arrived in time to fire on the British at Concord Bridge and participate in the running battle that chased the Redcoats back to Boston.

Abraham Lincoln passed through the town during his pre-inaugural tour of New England.

The Oak View Mansion, located in Norwood, was built by Francis Olney Winslow. Construction began in 1868 and was completed in 1870. Oak View was the scene of almost constant socializing. Some of the most prominent figures hosted in Oak View were President and future Supreme Court Justice William Howard Taft and President Calvin Coolidge.

The town shares its name with a town in the borough of Croydon, South London, England. When Norwood separated from Dedham, they considered naming the new community Balch, after the Rev. Thomas Balch.

Geography

Norwood is located at  (42.185974, −71.201661).

The Town of Norwood is located 13 miles southwest of Boston, placing it in the Boston Metropolitan Area.

According to the United States Census Bureau, the town has a total area of 10.6 square miles (27.3 km), of which 10.5 square mile (27.1 km) is land and 0.1 square mile (0.2 km) (0.66%) is water.

Demographics

As of the census of 2010, there were 30,602 people. The racial makeup of the town was 80.92% White, 8.01% Black or African American, 0.09% Native American, 9.57% Asian, 0.01% Pacific Islander, 0.77% from other races, and 1.25% from two or more races. Hispanic or Latino of any race were 3.58% of the population. 27.3% were of Irish descent.

As of the census of 2000, there were 28,587 people, 11,623 households, and 7,380 families residing in the town. The racial makeup of the town was 90.51% White, 2.31% Black or African American, 0.09% Native American, 5.06% Asian, 0.01% Pacific Islander, 0.77% from other races, and 1.25% from two or more races. Hispanic or Latino of any race were 1.65% of the population. 34.7% were of Irish, 14.8% Italian, 5.4% American and 5.0% English ancestry according to Census 2000.

There were 11,623 households, out of which 27.2% had children under the age of 18 living with them, 50.9% were married couples living together, 9.9% had a female householder with no husband present, and 36.5% were non-families. 29.4% of all households were made up of individuals, and 12.0% had someone living alone who was 65 years of age or older. The average household size was 2.41 and the average family size was 3.05.

In the town, the population was spread out, with 20.8% under the age of 18, 6.4% from 18 to 24, 33.2% from 25 to 44, 22.1% from 45 to 64, and 17.6% who were 65 years of age or older. The median age was 39 years. For every 100 females, there were 89.7 males. For every 100 females age 18 and over, there were 86.5 males.

The median income for a household in the town was $58,421, and the median income for a family was $70,164 (these figures had risen to $66,743 and $80,292 respectively as of a 2007 estimate). Males had a median income of $50,597 versus $34,312 for females. The per capita income for the town was $27,720. About 2.7% of families and 4.4% of the population were below the poverty line, including 6.5% of those under age 18 and 3.9% of those age 65 or over.

Education

The Norwood Public Schools operates seven schools, and an additional school institution, The Willett Early Childhood Center (serves preschool and kindergarten children). The public elementary schools located in Norwood include: Balch, Callahan, Cleveland, Oldham, and Prescott.

Norwood has one public middle school, the Dr. Philip O. Coakley Middle School (serving 6th through 8th graders) (formerly Norwood Junior High South), where all five elementary schools combine. Norwood also has a public high school, Norwood High School (NHS), (serves grades 9–12). 
 
Built in 2005, Universal Technical Institute is the newest post-secondary education center in Norwood.  It is an automotive technical school featuring the Mercedes Benz Elite MSAT and the Ford FACT specialized training programs.  The campus is located at 1 Upland Road, less than a mile from the Boston Providence Pike.

The Fine Mortuary College in Norwood includes a one-room museum featuring antique embalming tables and centuries-old wooden coffins.

Business

Businesses in Norwood have access to the most educated workforce in the nation, ample venture capital, and several other advantages that help lay the foundation for regional clusters and Norwood's target industries, like advanced manufacturing and life sciences.

Norwood's top employers include Moderna, FM Global, Home Market Foods, MS Walker, and many other manufacturers and businesses engaged in research and development.

Moderna opened its state-of-the-art clinical development site in 2018, employing over 1,400. Moderna's NOrwood facilities serve as its primary manufacturing facility and is responsible for producing its COVID-19 vaccine. The facility in Norwood has been expanded to increase the production capacity of Moderna's vaccine and to support the company's research and development efforts. Additionally, Moderna has established partnerships with local organizations in Norwood to support the community, including funding for education and workforce development initiatives.

A large cluster of automobile dealerships on Route 1 is known as the Norwood "Automile." The concept of having competing dealerships join together to publicize the "Automile" as an automobile shopping center was largely the work of Ernie Boch, famous in the Boston area for his ads urging people to "Come on down!"

The Skating Club of Boston moved to Norwood in 2020. The facility, located on University Avenue in Norwood, is a state-of-the-art skating rink home to the Skating Club of Boston's training and development programs for figure skating, ice dancing, and synchronized skating. The Norwood High School hockey teams play at the facility. In addition to the rink, the facility features a fitness center, a pro shop, and a cafe. The Skating Club of Boston has a rich history in figure skating and has produced many world champions and Olympic medalists.

Also of note, local bagel shop "Spot!" is currently seeking Guinness certification as the World's Largest Bagel Shop.

Architecture

Norwood's town square is dominated by its town hall, the Norwood Memorial Municipal Building (Town Hall). It includes a 50-bell carillon tower housing the Walter F. Tilton Memorial Carillon, one of nine carillons in Massachusetts.  On the National Register of Historic Places.
Morrill Memorial Library (1898–1899), Joseph Ladd Neal, architect.

Art
Norwood was the long-time home of photographer and publisher Fred Holland Day. As a photographer, Day at one point rivalled Alfred Stieglitz in influence. The publishing firm of Copeland and Day was the American publisher of Oscar Wilde's Salome with illustrations by Aubrey Beardsley. The Day House is now a museum and the headquarters of the Norwood Historical Society. F. Holland Day Historic House Museum is located at 93 Day St.

Climate

Transportation
 U.S. 1 is a major artery through Norwood, and a regional hub for commercial activity, dominated by strip malls and chain stores and restaurants for a 35-mile stretch between West Roxbury to Pawtucket, RI.)
 Three MBTA Commuter Rail stations on the Forge Park-495 line or Franklin Line, with daily service. The stations are Norwood Depot, Norwood Central and Windsor Gardens.
 Norwood Memorial Airport
 Interstate 95 has one exit in town that also serves neighboring Canton. This is the main highway running between the Boston metro area and points south.
 MBTA bus route 34E heads along Washington Street from Walpole to Boston.

Notable people

 Keith Adams, former NFL linebacker
 Frank G. Allen, Governor of Massachusetts, 1929–1931
 Dicky Barrett, lead singer of The Mighty Mighty Bosstones
 Harry Bigelow, lawyer
 Ernie Boch, Jr., CEO, president, and spokesman of Boch Enterprises, a $1 billion business consisting primarily of automobile dealerships in Norwood
 Peter Boghossian, American philosopher and author
 Charlie Bowles, former major league baseball player
 Marty Callaghan, former major league baseball player
 F. Holland Day, photographer
 Allen Doyle, golfer, 11-time winner on Champions Tour
 Joe Dugan, former Baseball player and member of the New York Yankees first World Series title in 1923
 Alfred Fincher, former pro football player for Washington Redskins
 William Cameron Forbes, Governor General of the Philippines, 1909–1913
 Zhenya Gay, writers and children's book illustrator
 Joseph Gould, "Professor Seagull" and the author of the unpublished "Oral History of our Time" 
 Noah Hanifin, current NHL defenseman for the Calgary Flames
 Richie Hebner, former major league baseball player
 Joe Hulbig, former NHL player, Boston and Edmonton
 Peter Laviolette, NHL and Olympic hockey coach
 Rhoda Leonard, All-American Girls Professional Baseball League player, teacher in Norwood public schools system
 Skip Lockwood, former major league baseball player
 Ray Martin, former major league baseball player
 Jon Purnell, United States Ambassador to Uzbekistan
 Brendan Emmett Quigley, crossword constructor
 Bob Quinn, general manager of NFL's Detroit Lions
 Allen Ripley, former major league baseball player
 John H. Rogers, former Massachusetts House Majority Leader
 Tony Rombola, guitar player for hard rock band Godsmack
 Mike Sherman, former Green Bay Packers and Texas A&M Aggies head coach
 Tom Shillue, stand-up comedian, barbershop quartet singer, host of Fox News Channel's overnight program Red Eye with Tom Shillue
 Mike Smith, former major league baseball player
 George Sullivan, former Notre Dame football champion, NFL player for the Boston Yanks, Massachusetts Senator and Judge
 Bill Travers,  former major league baseball player
 Michael D. Cohen, Actor and Comedian, Starred in Nickelodeon TV Series Henry Danger

Notes

References

External links

 Town of Norwood
 Industrial History of Norwood, Norwood Historical Society: Historical photographs and documents

 
Towns in Norfolk County, Massachusetts
Towns in Massachusetts